Brima George (died 20 February 2013) was a Sierra Leonean footballer. He played in one match for the Sierra Leone national football team in 1994. He was also named in Sierra Leone's squad for the 1994 African Cup of Nations tournament. George died in poverty, after suffering from mental illness for more than a decade.

References

Year of birth missing
2013 deaths
Sierra Leonean footballers
Sierra Leone international footballers
1994 African Cup of Nations players
Place of birth missing
Association football forwards